The 1922 Men's World Weightlifting Championships were held in Tallinn, Estonia from April 29 to April 30, 1922. There were 33 men in action from 4 nations.

Medal summary

Medal table

References
Results (Sport 123)
Weightlifting World Championships Seniors Statistics

External links
International Weightlifting Federation

World Weightlifting Championships
World Weightlifting Championships
International sports competitions hosted by Estonia
World Weightlifting Championships
Weightlifting in Estonia